Meeus may refer to:

People
 Ferdinand de Meeûs (1798–1861), Belgian banker, businessman and politician
 Jean Meeus (born 1928), Belgian meteorologist and amateur astronomer
 Jean Meeus (ice hockey), Belgian ice hockey player
 Jordi Meeus (born 1998), Belgian cyclist
 Leonardo Meeus, Belgian economist
 Roy Meeus (born 1989), Belgian football player
 Meeus van Dis (born 1978), Dutch Artist

Places
 , Belgium

Other
 2213 Meeus, main belt asteroid
 Meeûs d'Argenteuil family
 , Dutch corporation